The 2005 4 Nations Cup was the tenth playing of the annual women's ice hockey tournament. It was held in Finland, from August 31–September 4, 2005.

Results

Final Table

Final

3rd place

External links
Tournament on hockeyarchives.info

2005-06
2005–06 in Finnish ice hockey
2005–06 in Swedish ice hockey
2005–06 in Canadian women's ice hockey
2005–06 in American women's ice hockey
2005-06
2005–06 in women's ice hockey
August 2005 sports events in Europe
September 2005 sports events in Europe